is a Chisan Shingon temple in Sukumo, Kōchi Prefecture, Japan. Temple 39 on the Shikoku 88 temple pilgrimage, the main image is of Yakushi Nyorai, the Buddha of healing and medicine. The temple is said to have been founded by Gyōki in the first year of the Jinki era.

History 
Gyōki founded Enkōji in 724 after receiving an imperial command by Emperor Shōmu who had an interest in establishing a system of provincial temples in Japan. Gyōki carved a wooden statue of the deity Yakushi Nyorai which he designated as a honzon of the temple. In 911, a  climbed up to the temple grounds from the sea carrying a Buddhist temple bell on its back. Statues of this turtle can now be seen throughout the temple grounds along with images of the various deities that represent Enkōji.

Buildings
 Hondō, early Jinki period
 Sanmon: 
 Shōrō
 : Shrine within the temple grounds to conduct Goma rituals to ask for blessing from deities. Goma is conducted by burning cedar sticks available for purchase next to the gomadō. 
 ： It is said that in 795,  used a Khakkhara to break open the ground and pull water up to the surface of the earth to save the nearby villagers suffering from severe droughts. The remaining hole has been turned into a well, and is now known as the “eye cleansing well”.
 
 Japanese rock garden
 : Traditional Japanese garden style that has a pond and stream as the center point of the garden. At Enkōji, a statue of a turtle emerging from the pond is the main attraction of this garden.

Treasures
  (911) (Important Cultural Property): 33 cm tall, 25.2 cm circumference, 23.5 cm diameter (at the mouth of the bell). The oldest Buddhist temple bell in all of Kochi Prefecture. 
 Wooden Yakushi Nyorai, Nikkō bosatsu, and Gakkō bosatsu statues (Sukumo City Designated Tangible Cultural Property ICP)
 Chinese juniper tree (Sukumo City Designated Natural Monument ICP): Estimated 400 years old. Designated an ICP by Sukumo City on July 24, 1963.

Gallery

See also

 Shikoku 88 Temple Pilgrimage
 Shikoku Henro Association Homepage

References

Buddhist temples in Kōchi Prefecture
Buddhist pilgrimage sites in Japan
Shingon Buddhism
8th-century establishments in Japan
8th-century Buddhist temples
Religious buildings and structures completed in 724